Antonio Maurer (born 25 February 1963) is a Mexican equestrian. He competed in two events at the 2000 Summer Olympics.

References

External links
 

1963 births
Living people
Mexican male equestrians
Olympic equestrians of Mexico
Equestrians at the 2000 Summer Olympics
Equestrians at the 2011 Pan American Games
Sportspeople from Mexico City
Pan American Games competitors for Mexico
Pan American Games medalists in equestrian
Pan American Games bronze medalists for Mexico
Medalists at the 2011 Pan American Games
20th-century Mexican people
21st-century Mexican people